Kıbrıslar is a village in the District of Kozan, Adana Province, Turkey.
Former name of the village is Tirezek - Tırazarg [Drazark] Դրազարկ in the Armenian language

References

“The Discovery of the Medieval Armenian Monastery of Drazark in Kıbrıslar, Cilicia”, Revue des Études Arméniennes, 39, 2020, pp. 361-402

Villages in Kozan District